The 2013–14 Colorado Buffaloes men's basketball team represented the University of Colorado in the 2013–14 NCAA Division I men's basketball season. Head coach Tad Boyle was in his fourth season at Colorado. They were members of the Pac-12 Conference and played their home games at the Coors Events Center. They were dismantled by Pittsburgh in the first round of the NCAA Tournament.

Departures

Recruits

Roster

Depth chart

Schedule and results
 
|-
!colspan=12 style="background:#000000; color:#CEBE70;"| Non-conference regular season

|-
!colspan=12 style="background:#000000;"| Pac-12 regular season

|-
!colspan=12 style="background:#000000;"| Pac-12 tournament

|-
!colspan=12 style="background:#000000;"| NCAA tournament

Rankings

See also
2013–14 Colorado Buffaloes women's basketball team

References

Colorado
Colorado Buffaloes men's basketball seasons
Colorado
Colorado Buffaloes men's basketball
Colorado Buffaloes men's basketball